Satheishtharan Ramachandran (born 21 January 1997) is a Malaysian male badminton player.

Achievements

BWF International Challenge/Series
Men's Singles

 BWF International Challenge tournament
 BWF International Series tournament
 BWF Future Series tournament

References

External links 
 

Malaysian male badminton players
Living people
1997 births
People from Selangor
Malaysian people of Tamil descent
Malaysian sportspeople of Indian descent
Universiade medalists in badminton
Universiade bronze medalists for Malaysia
Medalists at the 2017 Summer Universiade
21st-century Malaysian people